The Quatuor Bozzini is a string quartet that specializes in new and experimental music based in Montreal, Canada.

Since 1999, Quatuor Bozzini has been an original voice in new, experimental and classical music. Their skew is radically contemporary, propelling the hyper-creative Montréal scene, and beyond. Not content to parlay received wisdom, the quartet cultivates an ethos of risk-taking, and boldly venture off the beaten track. Quatuor Bozzini stands out with their “extraordinary playing” (Alex Ross, The New Yorker). With rigorous qualitative criteria, they have nurtured a vastly diverse repertoire, unbiased by the currents of fashion. This has led to over four hundred commissioned pieces, as well as close to five hundred premiered works. A Quatuor Bozzini concert is an intensely shared experience, with meticulous and sensuous attention to detail.

Praised by its “intense musicality and immense sensitivity” (Musicworks, Canada), Quatuor Bozzini was qualified in the Bandcamp Daily as “one of the most daring string quartets of the entire world.” The group presents an annual concert series in Montréal and also tours extensively in Canada, the United States, South America and Europe. Notable festivals and venues include MärzMusik Berlin (DE); Guildhall Barbican, Aldeburgh, Huddersfield (UK); Klangspuren in Schwaz, Porgy&Bess (AT); Festival Présences, Festival Riverrun (FR); Angelica, SoundSCAPE (IT); Oslo Poesi (NOR); Gaudeamus, Muziekgebouw, NovemberMusic (NL); Kortrijk (BEL); Ostrava Days (CZ); SIPFEST (ID); Tsuda Hall (JP) TIME:SPANS, Other Minds (USA).

Educational initiatives 

To ensure continual development in their art, the quartet's musical laboratories, the Composer's Kitchen, Performer's Kitchen and Bozzini Lab, work to mentor and support new generations of composers and performers. The quartet runs its own recording label, Collection QB, and has issued critically acclaimed albums, many of which have become reference recordings in the field. They have also issued albums with Edition Wandelweiser, Another Timbre, Wergo-Deutscher Musikrat, Centrediscs and ATMA Classique.

Awards 

In 2018, Quatuor Bozzini was awarded the Prix Opus — Performer of the Year by the Conseil québécois de la musique. Finalist to the 28th Grand Prix (Conseil des arts de Montréal, 2012), Quatuor Bozzini is also the recipient of three Opus Prizes “International Outreach” (2007), “Contemporary Disc of the Year” (2004), and “Discovery of the Year” (2001) as well as the Étoile-Galaxie Prize from Radio-Canada (2001), the Förderpreis Ernst von Siemens Musikstiftung (2007), the German Record Critics Prize for Arbor Vitae (2009) and the 2014 Friends of Canadian Music Award.

Interdisciplinary initiatives & Collaborators 

The Quatuor Bozzini has participated in the development and presentation of many interdisciplinary projects. Notable cross-disciplinary collaborators include stage director Jean-Frédéric Messier, dancer and choreographer Marc Boivin, theatrical composer Jennifer Walshe, and videographer Nathalie Bujold.

Other composers the quartet has worked with include Denys Bouliane, Louis Dufort, Christopher Fox, Malcolm Goldstein, Michael Oesterle, Martin Arnold and James Tenney.

Recordings 

The Quatuor Bozzini records primarily under its label Collection QB, founded in 2004; it has released 15 records consisting of both commissioned pieces and experimental works from the 20th and 21st centuries. These recordings appear frequently in Canada on the CBC and on numerous foreign radio stations.

Discography 
Hardscrabble Songs - Malcolm Goldstein (2002) In situ
Portrait Montréal - Vivier: Pulau Dewata; Lesage: Quatuor à cordes no 2; Oesterle: Daydream Mechanics V; Goldstein: A New Song of Many Faces for In These Times (2004) Collection QB
Steve Reich: Different Trains (2005) Collection QB
Jürg Frey: String Quartets (2006) Edition Wandelweiser
Canons + Hoquets - Skempton: Catch; Tendrils; Kondo: Kypsotony; Fern; Mr Bloomfield, His Spacing (2007) Collection QB
Und. Ging. Außen. Vorüber. (2007) Wergo
Arbor Vitae: James Tenney - Quatuors + Quintettes (2008) Collection QB
Le livre des mélancolies (with Jean-Guy Boisvert) - Grella-Możejko: ...River to the Ocean...; Lesage: Le livre des mélancolies; Brady: Slow Dances. (2008) Atma
Michel Gonneville: Hozhro (with Marianne Lambert and Mathieu Golin) (2009) Collection QB
À chacun sa miniature - 31 compositeurs (2011) Collection QB
Martin Arnold: Aberrare - Arnold: contact; vault; Liquidambars; Slew & Hop; Aberrare (Casting) (2011) Collection QB
Daniel Rothman, Ernstalbrecht Stiebler: Sens(e) Absence - Stiebler: Sehr langsam; Rothman: Sense Absence (2011) Collection QB
Jean Dermoe, Joanne Hétu: Le mensonge et l'identité (2011) Collection QB
Still Image: Chamber music by Owen Underhill - Underhill: String Quartet No. 4 - The Night; Still Image; String Quartet No. 3 - The Alynne; Trombone Quintet (with Jeremy Berkman) (2012) Centrediscs
John Cage: Four - Cage: String Quartet in Four Parts; Thirty Pieces for String Quartet; Four (2014) Collection QB
Jürg Frey: String Quartet No.3; Unhörbare Zeit (with Lee Ferguson and Christian Smith, percussion) (2015) Edition Wanderweiser
Cassandra Miller: Just So; String Quartets (2018) Another Timbre
Phil Niblock: Baobab/Disseminate as Five String Quartets (2019) Collection QB

Members

Current members 
Clemens Merkel (violin)
Alissa Cheung (violin)
Stéphanie Bozzini (viola)
Isabelle Bozzini (cello)

Past members 
Mira Benjamin (violin)
Charles-Étienne Marchand (violin)
Nadia Francavilla (violin)
Geneviève Beaudry (violin)

References 

https://quatuorbozzini.ca/en/

External links 
 
 Bozzini at Encyclopedia of Music in Canada

1999 establishments in Canada
Canadian string quartets
Musical groups established in 1999
Musical groups from Montreal